Leptodon is a genus of birds of prey. Its two members are similar, with a grey head, black upperparts and white underparts.

Species
They are: 

Grey-headed kite is a widespread species, breeding from eastern Mexico and Trinidad south to  Peru, Bolivia and northern Argentina. However, white-collared kite is restricted to northeastern Brazil, and is classified as Critically Endangered.

References

 A guide to the birds of Costa Rica by Stiles and Skutch 

 
Birds of prey
Bird genera
Higher-level bird taxa restricted to the Neotropics